The 21st Engineer Regiment is a military engineer regiment of the Italian Army based in Caserta in Campania. Today the regiment is the engineer unit of the Bersaglieri Brigade "Garibaldi". In 1937 the regiment was formed and assigned to the XXI Army Corps, which was based in the Cyrenaica in eastern Libya. During World War II the regiment formed engineer units for the Italian forces fighting in the Western Desert Campaign. After the Axis defeat in the Second Battle of El Alamein and the British conquest of Cyrenaica the regiment was declared lost.

Reformed in 1953 as battalion the unit was assigned in 1963 to the III Missile Brigade. In 1975 the battalion was named for the Timavo river and assigned the flag and traditions of the 21st Engineer Regiment. At the end of 1979 the battalion moved to Caserta in the South of Italy. In 1993 the battalion entered the reformed regiment.

History

World War II 
On 1 October 1937 the 21st Engineer Regiment was formed in Trani by the depot of the 9th Engineer Regiment for the XXI Army Corps in the eastern part of Italian Libya known as Cyrenaica. The regiment arrived in Benghazi in Libya on 17 October. The regiment consisted of three mixed engineer battalions, each with an engineer company and a connections company.

With the outbreak of World War II the regiment's depot began to mobilize new units:

 XXI Army Corps Engineer Battalion (for the XXI Army Corps)
 XXI Army Corps Connections Battalion (for the XXI Army Corps)
 LXII Mixed Engineer Battalion (for the 62nd Infantry Division "Marmarica")
 LXIII Mixed Engineer Battalion (for the 63rd Infantry Division "Cirene")

The regiment's battalions fought in the Western Desert Campaign. The regiment was declared lost after the Axis defeat in the Second Battle of El Alamein in November 1942 and the following British conquest of Cyrenaica.

Cold War 
On 1 January 1953 the XXI Engineer Battalion was formed in Trani and consisted of a command, two engineer companies, and a field park company. On 19 January 1963 the battalion moved to Vicenza in northern Italy and joined the III Missile Brigade, which was the Italian Army's nuclear sharing unit.

During the 1975 army reform the army disbanded the regimental level and newly independent battalions were granted for the first time their own flags. During the reform engineer battalions were named for a lake if they supported a corps or named for a river if they supported a division or brigade. On 1 October 1975 the XXI Engineer Battalion was renamed 21st Engineer Battalion "Timavo" and assigned the flag and traditions of the 21st Engineer Regiment. The battalion consisted of a command, a command and park company, and two engineer companies. On 1 February 1976 the battalion also included the 2nd Fusiliers Company in Vicenza, which was tasked with guarding the nuclear weapons depots "Site Pluto" in Longare and "Site River" in Tormeno.

On 31 December 1979 the 21st Engineer Battalion "Timavo" was disbanded, leaving only one autonomous engineer company in Vicenza. The battalion's flag was transferred to Caserta in the South of Italy, where since 1 February 1979 a new engineer battalion had been raised. On 1 January 1980 the flag and traditions of the 21st Engineer Regiment were given to the engineer battalion in Caserta, which was renamed 21st Engineer Battalion "Timavo". The battalion consisted of a command, a command and park company, and two engineer companies. On 1 January 1981 the regiment raised a third engineer company and on 1 January 1987 the Command and Park Company split into the Command and Services Company, and the Special Equipment Company.

Recent times 
On 21 September 1993 the battalion lost its autonomy and the next day the battalion entered the newly formed 21st Pioneer Regiment as Pioneer Battalion "Timavo". On 1 October 2000 the regiment was renamed 21st Engineer Regiment and on 1 December of the same year it was assigned to the Bersaglieri Brigade "Garibaldi".

Current structure 

As of 2023 the 21st Engineer Regiment consists of:

  Regimental Command, in Caserta
 Command and Logistic Support Company
 Sappers Battalion "Timavo"
 1st Sappers Company
 2nd Sappers Company
 3rd Sappers Company
 4th Deployment Support Company

The Command and Logistic Support Company fields the following platoons: C3 Platoon, Transport and Materiel Platoon, Medical Platoon, Commissariat Platoon, and EOD Platoon. Each of the two sapper companies fields a Command Platoon, an Advanced Combat Reconnaissance Teams Platoon, and two sapper platoons. The Deployment Support Company and Mobility Support Company field the battalion's heavy military engineering vehicles: Biber bridgelayers, Dachs armored engineer vehicles, cranes, excavators, Medium Girder Bridges etc. The sapper companies and Command and Logistic Support Company are equipped with VTLM "Lince" and VTMM "Orso" vehicles.

See also 
 Bersaglieri Brigade "Garibaldi"

External links
Italian Army Website: 21° Reggimento Genio Guastatori

References

Engineer Regiments of Italy